The 1966 Amstel Gold Race was the first edition of the annual road bicycle race "Amstel Gold Race", held on Sunday April 30, 1966, in the Dutch provinces of North Brabant and Limburg. The race stretched 302 kilometres, with the start in Breda and the finish in Meerssen. There were a total of 120 competitors, and 30 cyclists finished the race.

Result

External links
 Results

Amstel Gold Race
1966 in road cycling
1966 in Dutch sport
April 1996 sports events in Europe